Cocaine- and amphetamine-regulated transcript, also known as CART, is a neuropeptide protein that in humans is encoded by the CARTPT gene. CART appears to have roles in reward, feeding, and stress, and it has the functional properties of an endogenous psychostimulant.

Function 

CART is a neuropeptide that produces similar behavior in animals as cocaine and amphetamine, but conversely blocks the effects of cocaine when they are co-administered. The peptide is found in several areas, among them the ventral tegmental area (VTA) of the brain. When CART was injected into rat VTA, increased locomotor activity was seen, which is one of the signs of "central stimulation" caused by psychostimulants, such as cocaine and amphetamine. The same rats also tended to return to the place where they were injected. This is called conditioned place preference and is also seen after injection of cocaine.

CART peptides, in particular, CART(55–102), seem to have an important function in the regulation of energy homeostasis, and interact with several hypothalamic appetite circuits. CART expression is regulated by several peripheral peptide hormones involved in appetite regulation, including leptin, cholecystokinin and ghrelin, with CART and cholecystokinin having synergistic effects on appetite regulation.

CART is released in response to repeated dopamine release in the nucleus accumbens, and may regulate the activity of neurons in this area. CART production is upregulated by CREB, a protein thought to be involved with the development of drug addiction, and CART may be an important therapeutic target in the treatment of stimulant abuse.

Tissue distribution 

CART is an anorectic peptide and is widely expressed in both the central and peripheral nervous systems, particularly concentrated in the hypothalamus. CART is also expressed outside of the nervous system in pituitary endocrine cells, adrenomedullary cells, islet somatostatin cells, and in rat antral gastrin cells. Other structures and pathways associated with CART expression include the mesolimbic pathway (linking the ventral tegmental area to the nucleus accumbens) and amygdala.

CART is also found in a subset of retinal ganglion cells (RGCs), the primary afferent neurons in the retina. Specifically, it labels ON/OFF Direction Selective Ganglion Cells (ooDSGCs), a subpopulation of RGCs that stratify in both the ON and OFF sublamina of the Inner Plexiform Layer (IPL) of the retina. It is also found in a subset of amacrine cells in the Inner Nuclear Layer. No role as of yet has been proposed for the peculiar location of this protein in these cell types.

Clinical significance 

Studies of CART(54–102) action in rat lateral ventricle and amygdala suggest that CART plays a role in anxiety-like behavior, induced by ethanol withdrawal in rats. Studies on CART knock-out mice indicates that CART modulates the locomotor, conditioned place preference and cocaine self-administration effects of psychostimulants. This suggests a positive neuromodulatory action of CART on the effects of psychostimulants in rats. CART is altered in the ventral tegmental area of cocaine overdose victims, and a mutation in the CART gene is associated with alcoholism. By inhibiting the rewarding effects of cocaine, CART has a potential use in treating cocaine addiction.

CART peptides are inhibitors of food intake (anorectic) and closely associated with leptin and neuropeptide Y, two important food intake regulators. CART hypoactivity in the hypothalamus of depressed animals is associated with hyperphagia and weight gain. CART is thought to play a key role in the opioid mesolimbic dopamine circuit that modulates natural reward processes. CART also appears to play an important role in higher brain functions like cognition.

History 

CART was found by examining changes in the brain following cocaine or amphetamine administration. CART mRNA increased with cocaine administration. One of the goals was to find an endogenous anoretic substance. CART inhibited rat food intake by as much as 30 percent. When naturally occurring CART peptides were blocked by means of injecting antibodies for CART, feeding was increased. This led to suggestions that CART may play a role – though not being the only peptide – in satiety. In the late 1980s, researchers started to synthesize structurally cocaine-like and functionally CART-like substances in order to find medications that could help treat eating disorders as well as cocaine abuse. Chemically, these substances belong to phenyltropanes.

CART receptor
The putative receptor target for CART evaded identification through 2011, however in vitro studies strongly suggested that CART binds to a specific G protein-coupled receptor coupled to Gi/Go, resulting in increased ERK release inside the cell. In 2020, CART was identified as the ligand for GPCR160. 

Several fragments of CART have been tested to try and uncover the pharmacophore, but the natural splicing products CART(55–102) and CART(62–102) are still of highest activity, with the reduced activity of smaller fragments thought to indicate that a compact structure retaining all three of CART's disulphide bonds is preferred.

See also
 Amphetamine
 Cocaine

References

External links
 

Amphetamine